"Maternity Leave" is the 15th episode of the second season of the American drama television series Lost, and the 40th episode overall. The episode was directed by Jack Bender, and written by Dawn Lambertsen Kelly and Matt Ragghianti. It first aired on ABC in the United States on March 1, 2006.
The character of Claire Littleton (Emilie de Ravin) is featured in the episode's flashbacks, revealing what happened when she was kidnapped by Ethan, an Other.

"Maternity Leave" was seen by an estimated 16.43 million American household viewers. It received mixed-to-positive reviews from critics, with praise for the mysteries further revealed in the episode, while its rote plot development was criticized.

Plot
Aaron has become ill with a rash and fever, and Claire sets off in the night to find Jack Shephard (Matthew Fox). John Locke (Terry O'Quinn) intercedes and goes instead of her. While Locke is gone, Danielle Rousseau (Mira Furlan) appears and tells Claire that Aaron is "infected."

Claire has a flashback where she remembers being injected with a needle while pregnant. Kate Austen (Evangeline Lilly) sends Rousseau away, though Claire is now convinced that something is seriously wrong with Aaron.

Jack assures Claire that Aaron is fine and the fever will soon break, but Claire is unsure. She speaks to Libby (Cynthia Watros), who helps her recall memories from the two weeks when she was abducted by an Other named Ethan (William Mapother). Claire remembers what resembles a doctor's office and Ethan giving her injections. She was confused (apparently drugged) during this entire ordeal, and believed that she was still in Australia and about to leave for the United States.

Claire enlists Kate to help her find Rousseau, and to find a vaccine she remembered from her memories, believing that it is the cure for Aaron's ailment. Claire asks Sun-Hwa Kwon (Yunjin Kim) to take care of Aaron while she is away. Sun tells her that a mother should never leave her child. Claire asks Sun if she is a mother. Sun replies "no", but agrees to watch the baby. The conversation with Sun again triggers a memory of Claire's which Ethan gave her injections before leading her to a baby room, to her surprise. During the escort, Claire observed a lair with a slope and stairs going to a metal wall, as well as a modified Dharma Initiative logo unlike the one in The Swan.

She also remembers Ethan talking to an other (M. C. Gainey). The other tells Ethan he is unhappy that Claire was brought to the facility, as "the list" had not been prepared. He also mentions that a higher authority will not be pleased. Ethan tells the other that the survivors had a passenger manifest and knew that he (Ethan) was not on the plane.

Claire and Kate soon find Rousseau, who is puzzled by an increasingly irrational Claire. However, Rousseau takes them back to the place where she said she found Claire the night Claire returned to camp after her abduction. There, Claire wants Rousseau to take her to the room with the vaccine and grows accusatory of Rousseau aiding her abduction when Rousseau tells her she doesn't know where the room is.

Claire suddenly notices a stump in the jungle that triggers another memory; she remembers Ethan Rom talking to her about leaving the baby with his group when they had a walk out of the facility. Ethan tells Claire that she does have a choice in the matter. Ethan gives Claire some water from a canteen, and she complains of the sour taste. Ethan tells Claire that her baby is one of the "good ones."

Investigating further, the three women find a concealed bunker with the DHARMA logo on it. Unlike the swan symbol in the DHARMA logo on the Facility 3 bunker, the symbol on this bunker is a caduceus. Inside, all but one of the lights are out and the bunker appears to be abandoned. Claire finds rooms familiar to her memories, she finds a bootie she crocheted during the last time she was there and puts it in her pack, while Kate investigates another part of the bunker. She discovers a set of lockers. Upon opening one, she discovers tattered clothes, a box containing makeup, theatrical glue, and a beard — all parts of the disguise worn by the other in her previous encounter with him.

Claire locates the refrigerator where she remembered the vaccine being stored; it is now empty. She has a flashback of a young teenaged girl (Tania Raymonde) who rescues her from the bunker, telling Claire that the other members of her group plan to take the baby and kill Claire. Rousseau then leaves, telling Claire that she is "not the only one who didn't find what they were looking for."

Back in the jungle, Claire has one final flashback where she remembers that Rousseau aided her escape, and was not part of the group that kidnapped her. She asks Rousseau about the baby that the Others took from her sixteen years ago. Claire asks if the child was a girl and Rousseau replies, "Yes, a girl, Alex. Alexandra." Claire then tells Rousseau that a teenaged girl with blue eyes helped her escape. Claire says, "She wasn't like the others. She was good." Rousseau, on the verge of tears, then warns Claire that if Aaron is infected, she knows what she'll have to do. Claire and Kate return to camp, where Jack tells her Aaron's fever has subsided. Claire then takes out the bootie that she found in the bunker and gives it to Aaron.

Meanwhile, Jack and Locke are trying to decide what to do about their new prisoner, Henry Gale (Michael Emerson). Locke gives Henry a copy of the Fyodor Dostoyevsky novel The Brothers Karamazov. A minute later, Locke tells Jack that Ernest Hemingway wanted to be the greatest writer in the world, but felt that he could never escape being in the shadow of Dostoyevsky.

Mr. Eko (Adewale Akinnuoye-Agbaje) visits the bunker during this time and figures out what is going on. He asks Jack to let him visit with the prisoner, alone, and Jack agrees after Eko subtly threatens that he will tell the rest of the camp about the prisoner. Eko tells Henry about the two men he killed when they tried to abduct him from his camp. Henry asks why Eko is telling him, and Eko replies that he had to tell someone. Eko threateningly takes out his knife, cuts two knots out of his beard, and leaves.

Locke brings dinner to Henry, who strikes up a conversation about Hemingway and Dostoyevsky. Henry had heard the earlier talk about the authors through the thin walls. Henry asks Locke which of the authors he relates to more, but Locke does not have an answer. He then asks Locke why he lets Jack call the shots, but Locke insists that he and Jack make decisions together. Locke locks up Henry and returns to the bunker's kitchen, where he loses his temper and violently sweeps the dishes off the counter (which could be heard by Henry).

Production
Tania Raymonde was told her character would be called "Jessica" when first cast in the role, and her character was promoted as a survivor who would be introduced in "Maternity Leave'. Cast members often read fake lines with a different name in their audition to limit potential spoilers from leaking. In her first appearance, Raymonde was credited as "young girl", preventing viewers knowing in advance that Alex would be introduced.

Reception
16.43 million American viewers watched "Maternity Leave" live.

Writing in 2008 for IGN, Chris Carabott gave the episode a grade of 7.5 out of 10 and commended the further revelations about the Others, though he pointed out that it is still slight enough that casual viewers could understandably be frustrated. Alan Sepinwall considered "Maternity Leave" a notable improvement over the previous episode, "One of Them", stating that the former had "[m]ystery revelations that were actually useful". Daniel MacEachern of Television Without Pity gave the episode a B+.

However, in another IGN article in 2014, Eric Goldman ranked "Maternity Leave" as 95th out of all the episodes of Lost, emphasizing the routine quality of the plot with the onomatopoeic "Zzzzzz", which indicates snoring.

References

External links

"Maternity Leave" at ABC

Lost (season 2) episodes
2006 American television episodes